Sage was a lightweight RSS and atom feed aggregator extension for the Mozilla Firefox web browser. The extension was developed by Peter Andrews and Erik Arvidsson.

Sage won the "Most Innovative" award in Mozilla's 2006 "Extend Firefox" competition.

Although as of 2021 the official website is still online, the links to the actual extension on Mozilla Add-ons are not working anymore. Among the alternative aggregator extensions there is one that aims to replace the original Sage, both in name ("Sage-Like") and functionality.

References

External links

Sage-Like alternative extension

Free Firefox legacy extensions
Free news aggregators
Atom (Web standard)